John Alton Claude Keller (October 23, 1911 – June 3, 1978) was an American hurdler who set world records in both 120 yard/110 meter and 220 yard events. He won the 110 m hurdles at the 1932 United States Olympic Trials, but narrowly missed out on a medal at the Olympics, placing a close fourth.

Hurdling career
Jack Keller studied at Ohio State University and succeeded sprinter George Simpson as the Ohio State Buckeyes' leading track and field star. As a sophomore in 1931, he won the 220 yard hurdles in 23.5 at the Big Ten conference meet; he was favored in the 120 yard hurdles as well, but was narrowly defeated by Illinois's Lee Sentman in a world-record-equaling 14.4. He then led Ohio State to a second-place finish in the NCAA Championships, winning both the 120 yard hurdles (14.6) and the 220 yard hurdles (23.8) in difficult conditions and tying for highest points scorer of the meet.

Keller continued to improve in 1932 and won that year's Big Ten 120-yard title in a world-record-breaking 14.0, defeating Iowa's new star George Saling. However, due to wind assistance this time could not be ratified as a record. Keller and Saling then split the two races at the NCAA Championships on June 11, both running under the respective world records: Saling won the 120 yard hurdles in 14.1 as Keller placed third, while Keller defended his title in the longer race, beating Saling by a step in 22.7 to break Charles Brookins's world record of 23.0. However, neither time was ratified as a world record.

At the Olympic Trials on July 16 Keller again came out on top in the 110 meter hurdles, running 14.4 into a headwind to defeat Saling and the previous year's national champion, Percy Beard. His winning time equaled the world record for the metric hurdles; automatically timed as 14.53, it was the first hurdling record to have been automatically timed. The three Americans were clear favorites for the Olympics and were expected to sweep the medals.

At the Olympics in Los Angeles Keller easily advanced from the first two rounds, winning his heat in 14.9 and the first semi-final in 14.5, an Olympic record. However, that record only lasted for a few minutes, as the other semi-final was won by Saling in 14.4. In the final Keller led for the first four hurdles, but hit the fifth hurdle and was caught first by Beard and then the eventual winner, Saling. He was originally thought to have come in third and was presented with the Bronze Medal; however, after review of the Kirby Two-Eyed Camera films, officials determined that Britain's Don Finlay was the bronze medalist and they asked Keller to give the medal to Finlay.

Saling died in a car accident in April 1933, leaving Keller on top. After watching Keller win the 120 yard hurdles at the 1933 Penn Relays in 14.3, 1920 Olympic champion and former world record holder Earl Thomson called him the "world's greatest hurdler", saying Keller was easily better than he had been. Keller won that year's Big Ten championships in 14.1 (a world record) and 23.5. However, at the NCAA Championships he fell in his heat in the 120 yard hurdles and failed to qualify for the final; the knee gashes he suffered in that fall spoiled his performance in the 220 yard hurdles as well.

Keller retired from hurdling after the 1933 season, and went on to become the managing editor of the Columbus, Ohio Citizen Journal. He attempted a brief comeback in 1936.

Notes

References

1911 births
1978 deaths
American male hurdlers
Athletes (track and field) at the 1932 Summer Olympics
World record setters in athletics (track and field)
Ohio State Buckeyes men's track and field athletes
Olympic track and field athletes of the United States